Márkos Vamvakáris (10 May 1905 – 8 February 1972), was a rebetiko musician. He is universally referred to by rebetiko writers and fans simply by his first name, Márkos. The great significance of Vamvakaris for the rebetiko is also reflected by his nickname: the "patriarch of the rebetiko".

Biography

Vamvakaris was born on 10 May 1905 in Ano Syros (or Ano Khora), Syros, Greece. He was the first of six children, while his family belonged to the sizeable Roman Catholic community of the island, the "Francosyrians", a name deriving from the colloquial Greek reference to West Europeans collectively as "the Franks".

At the age of twelve, in the false belief that he was wanted by the police, Vamvakaris fled Syros for the port of Piraeus. He worked as a stevedore, a pit-coal miner, a shoe-polisher, a paperboy, a butcher, and other odd jobs. He heard a bouzouki player playing, and vowed that if he did not learn to play the instrument in six months he would chop off his own hand with a cleaver (he was working in the public abattoirs at the time). He learned bouzouki, becoming an innovative virtuoso player, and began to write songs of his own. At first he often played in clandestine hashish-smoking establishments known as tekés; later he and his band, which included Giorgos Batis, Anestis Delias and Stratos Pagioumtzis played in more legitimate clubs and taverns. They were extremely popular, and Markos made many recordings. His initial nickname among the rebetes was "the Frank" (Fragos).

Spyros Peristeris, a well-educated musician and repertory manager and orchestra leader for several recording companies, persuaded Vamvakaris to record his songs sung with his own voice. Vamvakaris recorded his first rebetiko disc, Na'rchósouna re magka mou (Να 'ρχόσουνα ρε μάγκα μου) in 1932. Among other songs in that period, he wrote the classic love song "Frankosyriani" (Φραγκοσυριανή).

After the liberation of Greece from the occupation of Nazi Germany, difficult times persisted, but his kind of music was no longer fashionable. He also suffered badly with arthritis in his hands which crippled his bouzouki playing, and from asthma that hampered his singing. The slump in his fortunes lasted until the early 1960s when, after initiatives by Vassilis Tsitsanis, many of his old songs were revived and sung by singers including Grigoris Bithikotsis, and Stratos Dionysiou. Vamvakaris died on 8 February 1972 at the age of 66.

Markos' composing style was utterly simple: minimal orchestration, melodic lines stripped of any embellishment, and lyrics as devoid of ornamentation as possible. His strophic masterpiece "Your eyelashes shine" is a typical example of his art. It consists of just three short couplets, each sung twice to the same melodic phrase, with clauses reversed for the second time, and with a single instrumental phrase interspersed between them:  
Your eyelashes shine
like the flowers of the meadow.
Your eyes, sister,make my little heart crack.Search till you're blind:you won't find another like me.
As the years pass, his towering contribution to Greek music emerges. All other Greek composers, of his time and afterwards, revere him as their master teacher, and Mikis Theodorakis remarked: "We all, we are but branches of a tree. Markos is that tree".

Discography
Markos may be heard on many of the anthology CDs listed in the rebetiko discography. CDs of his own which may be available in English language countries include:
 Markos Vamvakaris Bouzouki Pioneer: 1932–1940 Rounder Select, 1998.
 Rembetika 5-Master of Rembetika 1932-193 [Box set] (4 discs) Jsp Records, 2010.
 The Road to Rembetica Trad. Crossroads, 2010 (accompanying CD to the Book by Gail Holst – see References section)

Personal life
Markos married his first wife with a Catholic marriage. After their divorce (for which he wrote a song), he married his second wife, Evangelia, with a Greek Orthodox marriage. He had three sons: Vasilis, Stelios (a musician also) and Dominikos.

In popular culture
Stavros Xarchakos and Nikos Gatsos wrote a song called Gramma sto Marko Vamvakari (Letter to Markos Vamvakaris, Greek: Γράμμα στο Μάρκο Βαμβακάρη), sung by George Dalaras and actress Despo Diamantidou. Also, Thodoros Derveniotis and Kostas Virvos wrote Markos, sung by Kaiti Abavi. Markos Vamvakaris is also mentioned in the following songs:
Deka palikaria (Ten lads, Greek: Δέκα παλικάρια) by Manos Loïzos and Lefteris Papadopoulos, sung by George Dalaras
Ihes thalasses sta matia (You had seas in your eyes, Greek: Είχες θάλασσες στα μάτια) by Elias Andriopoulos and Michalis Bourboulis, sung by Antonis Kalogiannis
I mikri istoria tis Marinas (The short story of Marina, Greek: Η μικρή ιστορία της Μαρίνας) by Dionysis Tsaknis
Rock feggari (Rock moon, Greek: Ροκ φεγγάρι) by Andreas Mexas and Vasilis Mastrokostas, sung by Paschalis Terzis
San ton Samouil sto Kougi (Like Samuel in Koughi, Greek: Σαν τον Σαμουήλ στο Κούγκι) by Tzimis Panousis
Sto retire (In the penthouse, Greek: Στο ρετιρέ) by Angelos Axiotis, sung by Antonis Kalogiannis
Ta mesimeria tis Kyriakis (Sunday afternoons, Greek: Τα μεσημέρια της Κυριακής) by Giorgos Hatzinasios and Yiannis Logothetis, sung by Manolis Mitsias
 Graphic novel Rébétiko by David Prudhomme (Futuropolis, 2009)

Notes

References
 Markos Vamvakaris, Autobiography (Μάρκος Βαμβακάρης- Αυτοβιογραφία – Εκδ. Παπαζήση, 1978), published by Papazisi, 1978 (in Greek)
 Road to Rembetika: Music of the Greek Sub-culture [Paperback] by Gail Holst (Author), Denise Harvey (Publisher); 5th edition (February 1994),

External links
 Markos Vamvakaris Autobiography in English
 Markos Vamvakaris Autobiography in French
 
  Vamvakaris Biography and Discography (in Greek)
 The Markos Vamvakaris Museum
 There is a 2001 documentary made of his life and times, entitled "I Like Hearts Like Mine", by George C. Zervas, in Greek with English subtitles: http://www.der.org/films/i-like-hearts-like-mine.html

1905 births
1971 deaths
People from Ano Syros
Greek Roman Catholics
20th-century Greek male singers
Greek singer-songwriters
Rebetiko musicians
Greek bouzouki players
Cannabis music